United States law enforcement decorations are awarded by the police forces of the United States of America.  Since the United States has a decentralized police force, with separate independent departments existing on the state and local level, there are thousands of law enforcement decorations in existence.

Usage and history
Law enforcement medals and badges first appeared in the late 19th century, as used by some of the (then) largest police departments in the country, such as the New York City Police Department and Chicago Police Department.  Early law enforcement awards were often pins and badges awarded on a case-by-case basis.  Standardized law enforcement awards began to appear once police departments began issuing more codified and structured uniform regulations. 

Originally, law enforcement awards were rarely awarded, and then only for acts of heroism or bravery.  The oldest police awards thus have such names as "Medal of Valor" and "Medal of Honor".  Later in the 20th century, police departments began issuing medal ribbons for such routine tasks as years of service, completion of training, or simply general membership in the police.  Law enforcement awards, historically the domain of larger city departments, became more common with smaller local and town offices, as well as Sheriff's departments, towards the end of the 20th century. 

Typically, law enforcement decorations are bestowed by a particular police department and may only be worn and displayed while a police officer is serving as a member of that particular law enforcement activity.  Most such awards are provided by city, county and state officials.  Federal law enforcement agencies, such as the FBI, DEA, and the Department of Homeland Security issue medals under the authority of the United States government which are considered separate civilian government awards.

Law enforcement awards are often independently designed by the city, town, or county, where they are issued and many have a unique appearance to separate them from U.S. military awards (which are themselves often authorized for wear on police uniforms by military veterans).  During the trial of George Zimmerman, the Sanford Police Department came under heavy criticism when it was revealed on national television that their officers were wearing U.S. military awards, including such decorations as the Defense Distinguished Service Medal, with simply different names as police awards.  After numerous complaints to both the Sanford police and the Fraternal Order of Police, the department discontinued this practice of wearing U.S. military awards in lieu of unique police decorations.

Index of law enforcement awards
The following sections list various police decorations by awarding agency

Columbia Police Department
 Medal of Valor
 Purple Heart
 Certificate of Commendation
 Letter of Appreciation

Denver Police Department
 Denver Police Medal of Honor
 Denver Police Service Cross
 Denver Police Medal of Valor
 Police Purple Heart
 Police Lifesaving Medal
 Police Campaign Medal
 Physical Fitness Award

Elyria Police Department
  Elyria Police Medal of Honor
 Elyria Police Medal of Valor
 Police Lifesaving Medal
  Police Medal of Merit
  Police Purple Heart
 Police Commendation Medal
 Safe Driving Medal
 Tactical Squad Service Medal
 Community Service Medal
  Police Education Medal
  Advanced Certification Medal
 Field Training Officer Medal
 Top Gun Medal
  Police Honor Guard Medal

Indianapolis Metropolitan Police Department
 Medal of Honor
 Purple Heart
 Medal of Valor
 Medal of Bravery
 Medal of Merit
 Ruthann Popcheff Memorial Award

Los Angeles Police Department
  Los Angeles Police Medal of Valor
  Liberty Award
  Police Medal for Heroism
  Los Angeles Police Star
  Police Lifesaving Medal
  Police Commission Distinguished Service Medal
 Police Distinguished Service Medal
  Police Meritorious Service Medal
  Police Meritorious Achievement Medal
  Community Policing Medal
  Human Relations Medal
  Police Commission Unit Citation
 Police Meritorious Unit Citation
  Reserve Police Officer Service Ribbon
  1984 Summer Olympics Ribbon
  1987 Papal Visit Ribbon
  1992 Civil Disturbance Ribbon
  1994 Earthquake Ribbon

Minneapolis Police Department

 Medal of Honor
 Medal of Valor
 Medal of Commendation

Minnesota State Patrol

Montgomery County Police Department

New York City Police Department

  NYPD Medal of Honor
  NYPD Combat Cross
  NYPD Medal of Valor
 NYPD Purple Shield
  Meritorious Police Duty (MPD) Honorable Mention
  Meritorious Police Duty (MPD) Exceptional Merit
  Meritorious Police Duty (MPD) Commendation or Commendation – Integrity
  Meritorious Police Duty (MPD) Commendation – Community Service
  Meritorious Police Duty (MPD)
  Excellent Police Duty (EPD)

Oklahoma City Police Department
 Oklahoma Police Medal of Honor
 Oklahoma Police Cross
 Police Medal of Valor
 Medal of Meritorious Service

Philadelphia Police Department 

 Sgt. Robert F. Wilson III Commendation for Valor
 Commendation for Bravery
 Commendation for Heroism
 Commendation for Merit
 Commendatory Citation
 RNC Service Ribbon
 Military Service Ribbon

Saint Louis Metropolitan Police Department 

 Saint Louis Meritorious Award
 Saint Louis Medal of Valor – Crusade Against Crime
 Saint Louis Chief of Police Letter of Accommodation
 Saint Louis Captains Letter of Accommodation
 Saint Louis Officer of the Year Award
 Saint Louis Officer of the Month Award (Given each month in each of the Six Districts)
 Proclamation by the Mayor of the City of Saint Louis
 Proclamation by the City of Saint Louis Board of Aldermen

Sanford Police Department 

Prior to the controversy surrounding the display of obvious U.S. military award ribbons as police decorations, the Sanford police issued these ribbons (in order of precedence shown below) before discontinuing the practice.

St. Louis County Police Department
 St. Louis County Medal of Honor
 Police Medal of Valor
 St. Louis Distinguished Service Citation
 St. Louis Meritorious Service Citation
 Police Purple Heart
 Citizen's Recognition Medal

See also
 Police ranks of the United States
 Washington Law Enforcement Medal of Honor

References

United States law enforcement
 

{ NACOP} Awards the Law Enforcement Officers, Purple Heart to Officer Scott T Barnes 41 years after he was wounded and sustained injuries in the Line of Duty for a shooting that occurred in 12-17-77 on Ridgecrest PD. He was awarded the Law Enforcement Purple Heart by the American Police Hall of Fame & Museum this 10-18-18 nearly 41 years after the shooting of the suspect and the wounding of Officer Barnes while he engaged the suspect who had already injured 2 officers .